The Carabinani River ( is a river in the Amazonas state in north-western Brazil. 
It is a right tributary of the Jaú River

Course

The Carabinani River, which flows north east to enter the Jaú River a few kilometres before that river enters the Rio Negro, forms the boundary between the Jaú National Park on its left and the  Rio Negro State Park North Section on its right.

See also
List of rivers of Amazonas

References

Sources

Rivers of Amazonas (Brazilian state)